Anthony Holland (March 3, 1928 – July 9, 1988) was an American actor, best known for his comic performances in theatre, film and television.

Holland graduated from the University of Chicago and studied acting with Lee Strasberg during the 1960s. He was one of the original members of The Second City improvisational comedy group.

In 1987, he appeared in Martha Clarke's adaptation of several stories by Franz Kafka, The Hunger Artist, for which he received praise from The New York Times theatre critic Frank Rich.

His film appearances included the 1979 Bob Fosse film All That Jazz, the original 1970 version of the Neil Simon-penned The Out-of-Towners, Sidney Lumet's Bye Bye Braverman, Alan J. Pakula's Klute and Paul Mazursky's 1982 film Tempest. He also appeared in television series including Combat!, Columbo, The Mary Tyler Moore Show, M*A*S*H, Hill Street Blues and Cagney and Lacey. In 1973 he starred opposite Bernadette Peters and Carl Ballantine in the ABC musical comedy special Break Up.

Holland died by suicide in 1988. He had been ill with HIV/AIDS.

Partial filmography

References

External links 
 
 
 Anthony Holland papers, 1956-1988, held by the Billy Rose Theatre Division, New York Public Library for the Performing Arts

1928 births
1988 deaths
20th-century American male actors
American male stage actors
American male film actors
American male television actors
Suicides in New York City
People with HIV/AIDS
University of Chicago alumni
1988 suicides